Bassett House School is a coeducational preparatory school for children aged 3 to 11 years old based in North Kensington, London, UK. Bassett House has two sister schools, Orchard House School in Chiswick and Prospect House School in Putney. All three schools take both boys and girls from the age of 3 or 4 until the time they leave for their next senior or intermediate preparatory schools. Bassett House School was founded in 1947.

The building
Bassett House is located in North Kensington, in proximity to Ladbroke Grove and Latimer Road. Bassett House was built towards the end of the 19th century as a large family house.

The entire building was substantially rebuilt in 2001. The school premises include the church hall at St Helen's Church, just around the corner from 60 Bassett Road, providing an assembly hall with a stage and gymnasium, three classrooms, a kitchen and a garden.

The main school building has a playground which doubles as a basketball or netball court. Children are taken on most days to a nearby park for additional sports and recreation.

Notable alumni
 Derek Abbott, scientist

References

External links
 Bassett House homepage
 Profile on the ISC website

1947 establishments in England
Educational institutions established in 1947
Private co-educational schools in London
Private schools in the Royal Borough of Kensington and Chelsea
Preparatory schools in London